Leo Friedlander (July 6, 1888 – October 24, 1966) was an American sculptor, who has made several prominent works.  Friedlander studied at the Art Students League in New York City, the Ecole des Beaux Arts in Brussels and Paris, and the American Academy in Rome. He was an assistant to the sculptor Paul Manship and taught at the American Academy in Rome and at New York University, where he headed the sculpture department.  He was also president of the National Sculpture Society. In 1936, he was elected into the National Academy of Design as an Associate member, and became a full Academician in 1949.

Friedlander was married to Rhoda Lichter and had two children.

Public works
 Memory, Virginia War Memorial, Richmond, VA  (1956)
 The central pediment at the Museum of the City of New York  (1930)
 Sculptures at Washington Memorial Arch, Valley Forge National Historical Park
 Reliefs for the U.S. Chamber of Commerce in Washington, D.C.
 Sculpted reliefs, Jefferson County Courthouse, Birmingham, Alabama  (1931)
 Pylons, Social Science Building, Century of Progress International Exposition, Chicago  (1932) 1933-34
 Reliefs (1939) on the RCA Building at Rockefeller Center
 The Arts of War sculptures, Sacrifice and Valor, flanking the Arlington Memorial Bridge in Washington, D.C. (dedicated 1951)
 Four Freedoms statues, New York World's Fair  (1940)
 American Military Cemetery, Hamm, Luxembourg
 Covered Wagon sculptural panels, Oregon State Capitol, Salem, OR  (1934)
 Lewis and Clark sculptural panels, Oregon State Capitol, Salem, OR (1934)
 Roger Williams Statue, Prospect Terrace Park, Providence, RI (1939)
 Pioneer Woman Statue, Texas Woman's University, Denton, TX  (1938)
 Sculptured Clock, House of Representatives, Capitol Building, Washington, D.C.
 Bacchante, bronze statue, Metropolitan Museum of Art
 "Harmony Creates Tranquility" bronze medal, Metropolitan Museum of Art

References
 "Leo Friedlander, A Sculptor, Dies at 78," New York Times, October 25, 1966
 "Two New York Sculptors Will Design Figures, Symbols of War and Peace, for Lincoln Bridge", New York Times, February 6, 1930
 "New President Picked By Sculpture Society", New York Times, January 14, 1954
 Craven, Wayne, Sculpture in America, Thomas Y. Crowell Co, NY, NY  1968
 Goode, James M., The Outdoor Sculpture of Washington, DC, Smithsonian Press, Washington, DC, 1974

Images

External links
Short biography of Leo Friedlander
Historical background from the Houston Municipal Arts Office

1888 births
1966 deaths
20th-century American sculptors
20th-century American male artists
American architectural sculptors
American male sculptors
Art Students League of New York alumni
American alumni of the École des Beaux-Arts
Artists from New York City
New York University faculty
National Academy of Design members
National Sculpture Society members
Sculptors from New York (state)
Members of the American Academy of Arts and Letters